The Italian military rank of maresciallo (marshal) is classified as a "sub-officer" and is the highest rank of non-commissioned officer in the Italian Armed Forces, higher than the rank of sergeant but lower than that of ensign/second lieutenant; there are from three to five grades within the rank, according to the different branches of the armed forces. The rank is achieved through merit or attending the Scuola Allievi Marescialli (School of Student Marshals). Marshal is an intermediate rank of the armed forces which is currently granted to NCOs with the training and technical competence to carry out specialised executive roles, and to command smaller and technically complex units.

History
The rank of marshal in Italy was initially provided only as the marescialli d'alloggio (lodging marshals) of the Royal Carabinieri. In 1902  the rank was established for the Royal Army. The rank was unique and higher than that of furiere maggiore (senior quartermaster). Subsequently in 1907  the ranks of quartermaster and quartermaster were abolished and the rank of marshal was divided into three classes: 1st, 2nd and 3rd class marshal who were then renamed Maresciallo maggiore, Maresciallo capo and Maresciallo ordinario respectively. The badges of rank were regulated only on January 22, 1907 by a circular. In the Regia Marina the equivalent ranks were those of capo di 1ª, 2ª e 3ª classe. 

At the entrance to the War of Italy in World War One the ranks of maresciallo ordinario, maresciallo capo and maresciallo Maggiore existed and were retitled as Maresciallo di Compagnia, Maresciallo di Battaglione, and Maresciallo di Reggimento. In 1916 the degree of "Aiutanti di Battaglia" was established, reachable from both the non-commissioned officers and troops solely for war merits, regardless of the previously covered degree.  Until 1972 the marshals were framed in three hierarchical levels:  maresciallo ordinario, maresciallo capo and maresciallo maggiore and had a distinctive respectively one, two or three mottled golden stripes of black placed vertically on the shoulder straps. Later in the seventies, maresciallo maggiore aiutante was added, above the other degrees, but always subordinate to the degree of aiutante di battaglia. This degree was distinguished as it was reachable by promotion to choice and not for seniority, and had the same distinctive of Marshal Maggiore, but with the mottled rods of red. After 1972 for all marshal ranks were reoriented horizontally.

Insignia of the Royal Italian Army pre-World War One:

Insignia of the Royal Italian Army pre-World War One:

Insignia of the Maresciallo of the Royal Italian Army during World War II:

Insignia 1945-1972:

Insignia 1972-current:

New Maresciallo insignia added in 2018

 Primo luogotenente q.s.

Modern Italian military

In the Italian Army a marshal is a non-commissioned officer. The grades of marshal are as follows beginning with the lowest:
 maresciallo - marshal
 maresciallo ordinario - ordinary marshal
 maresciallo capo - chief marshal
 primo maresciallo (before 2001 maresciallo aiutante) first marshal (until 2001 adjutant marshal)
 luogotenente - sub-lieutenant (grade instituted in 2001).)

In the Italian Navy the grades of marshal are as follows:
 capo di terza classe - chief third class
 capo di seconda classe - chief second class
 capo di prima classe - chief first class
 primo maresciallo - first marshal (degree instituted in 2001)
 luogotenente - sub-lieutenant (grade instituted in 2001).

In the Italian Air Force the grades of marshal are as follows:
 maresciallo di terza classe - marshal third class
 maresciallo di seconda classe - marshal second class
 maresciallo di prima classe - marshal first class
 primo maresciallo - first marshal (until 2001[1] adjuvant marshal)
  luogotenente -  sub-lieutenant (grade instituted in 2001).

Italian gendarmerie

In the uniformed sectors - the Carabinieri and Guardia di Finanza -  those at the marshal level are called inspectors and are distinguished from supervisors and were once non-commissioned officers. Their grades resemble those in the Italian army:
 maresciallo - marshal
 maresciallo ordinario - ordinary marshal
 maresciallo capo - chief marshal
 primo maresciallo (before 2001 maresciallo aiutante) first marshal (until 2001 adjutant marshal)
 luogotenente - sub-lieutenant (grade instituted in 2001).

Adjutant marshal retains the rank of Official Substitute of Public Safety; lieutenant is not meaningfully a rank and dates from 2001.

See also
 Marshal of Italy
 First Marshal of the Empire
 Italian Army ranks
 Italian Navy ranks

References

Military ranks of Italy

it:Maresciallo